The Pentecostal Missionary Church of Christ (4th Watch), also known as PMCC (4th Watch), is a Pentecostal Christian denomination based in the Philippines. It was founded in 1971 by Arsenio T. Ferriol and registered on August 27, 1973. The church claims to be the 'One True Church of Christ', with its beliefs coming from the Bible as the sole basis for all its doctrines and prophecies about the 'Church of Jesus Christ' established by a living modern-day Apostle in the modern era (whereas the church doctrine calls it "The 4th Watch") (Filipino transl. "Ikaapat na Pagpupuyat") The church has an estimated 800,000 members worldwide and 900 local churches, with Marikina Main Church serving as the largest and headquarters of the denomination.

Founder
Arsenio Tan Ferriol (born January 14, 1936), founder of the PMCC (4th Watch), is the church's current executive minister.

History
The Pentecostal Missionary Church of Christ (4th Watch) was founded in 1971 by Arsenio T. Ferriol along with his two brothers, Arturo Ferriol and Domingo Ferriol who co-founded it. The church had separated from the Foursquare Gospel Church where Arsenio became a bible student and former member during his younger years to become a trained pastor before leaving and later forming the People's Missionary Church, a small community church in Marikina City prior to its registration. The church was officially registered as the "Pentecostal Missionary Church of Christ (4th Watch)" to the Philippine Government on August 27, 1973, (a big founding celebration for the church). With Arsenio being their leader and a living "Apostle" which he claimed God commanded him through voice and light (Tagalog: 'Tinig at Liwanag') on a evening in 1970 in his hometown in Odiongan, Romblon, giving him the revelation through Jesus Christ to restore the 'Church of Christ' in the "4th Watch" (Modern Era) that was originally founded on the Day of Pentecost 2,000 years ago. They believe the "4th Watch" is the period where the Second Coming of Jesus will occur and that all believers and non-believers that got baptized by the church will be saved through Rapture, leaving the other Apostate and unworthy churches experience the Great Tribulation.

Today, it continues to be a rapidly growing denomination across the globe. Present in over 70 countries and territories worldwide with 900 locale churches in and out of the country. They are famously known for being missionaries because of their public preaching in public areas like markets, buses and parks in different corners of the world especially in the country, where they share the gospel and truth of Jesus Christ's imminent return and that salvation and repentance is the key to see God's heavenly kingdom. 1,000 locale churches are set to be accomplished by the year 2023 in time for their 50th Golden Celebration of the churches founding. PMCC publishes The Word magazine, and broadcasts television and radio programs including Oras ng Katotohanan and its U.S. counterpart Surer Word.  It owns Life Radio and has its own television network, Life TV.

Outreach

End-Time Mission Broadcasting Service (EMBS) is a radio and television broadcasting division of the PMCC through its Resources for Doctrinal Empowerment and Evangelistic Ministry (ReDEEM).  Its corporate office is located in Marikina, Philippines.  EMBS owns three radio stations under the Life Radio brand, and its television network Life TV.  PMCC's media ministry can be traced back to its flagship program, Oras ng Katotohanan (Hour of Truth), which started in the 1980s on radio and television.

Life TV

Life TV was launched October 3, 2016, coinciding with the 25th anniversary of ONK's TV broadcast.  It formerly aired 24 hours a day on SkyCable and Cignal TV.  Life TV currently broadcasts in English and Filipino via BEAM TV's DTT subchannel 18 hours daily, and through their online livestreaming.  Since 2017, Life TV became the second religious channel (next to Iglesia ni Cristo Television), known for broadcasting of the station's digital clock during the entire course of its 24/7 broadcast.  It is headquartered in Marikina, Philippines.

Programming
Life TV's programming consists of its in-house produced shows as well as imported from various productions. Selected programs were aired on BEAM TV UHF Channel 31.

Current programming
 Oras ng Katotohanan – the flagship program of PMCC (4th Watch) in the Philippines.
 Surer Word  – the U.S. program produced by PMCC (4th Watch) South Bay, California.
 The Truth
 Bible Connection
 The Word Today
 Gospel of Salvation
 The Living Word
 Home Free Radio
 Chords of Mercy
 Chords of Mercy UNLTD.
 Tuklasin Natin
 Prayer Power
 Moments with God
 Panahon.TV – a weather news program featuring live updates from PAGASA.
 Pag-Ibig Nga Naman
 Music of the Heart
 Life at Home
 Kalinga On-Air
 Pray-A-Thon
 May Plano ang Dios
 The Lord's Day
 Church Update
 Psalms, Verses & Inspirations
 Worship Sessions
 SciShow
 SciShow Space
 SciShow Kids
 The Bible Project
 Alla's Yummy Food
 Awesome Eats
 The Traveler's Guide

Previous programming
 Daily Watch (Life TV's first ever secular newscast)
 Church at Home
 Kaban ng Patotoo
 Hubblecast
 Wow HD Technology
 TBN Asia Block
 Morning Devotion
 Family Devotion
 Midweek Service
 Sunday School
 Evangelistic Service

Life Radio

Life Radio is a network of radio stations across the Luzon area, and serves as the ministry's radio service.

Life Radio stations

References

External links
 
 

Christian organizations established in 1974
Christian denominations in Asia
Pentecostal denominations
Churches in Metro Manila
Philippine radio networks